is the seventh major single (tenth overall) released by Scandal. The title track is the band's first original ballad, and it was used as a Recochoku commercial song, while the first B-side, "Midnight Television", was used as the ending theme of the anime film Loups=Garous. The first press of the single came with a special booklet. The single reached #14 on the Oricon weekly chart and charted for four weeks, selling 12,176 copies.

Track listing

References 

2010 singles
Scandal (Japanese band) songs
Songs written for films
2010 songs